Meurthe-et-Moselle is a department in the Grand Est region of France, named after the rivers Meurthe and Moselle. It had a population of 733,760 in 2019.

History 

Meurthe-et-Moselle was created in 1871 at the end of the Franco-Prussian War from the parts of the former departments of Moselle and Meurthe which remained French territory.

The current boundary between Meurthe-et-Moselle and Moselle was the border between France and Germany from 1871 to 1919 and again between 1940 and 1944. The only subsequent change took place in 1997 and involved the incorporation, for administrative reasons, of the little commune of Han-devant-Pierrepont which had previously fallen within the Meuse department.

Geography 

Meurthe-et-Moselle is part of the administrative region of Grand Est and the traditional region of Lorraine and is surrounded by the departments of Meuse, Vosges, Bas-Rhin, and Moselle, and by the nations of Luxembourg and Belgium by the salient of the Arrondissement of Briey. It is one of two departments in France which border with Luxembourg. Parts of Meurthe-et-Moselle belong to the Lorraine Regional Natural Park.

The department extends for 130 km from north to south and is between 7 and 103 km wide.

Its chief rivers are the Moselle, the Meurthe, the Chiers, and the Vezouze.

Economy 
The economy was highly dependent on mining until the 1960s. There are iron, salt, and lime extraction sites. The urban area around Nancy has an economy based largely on services, research, and higher education.

Demographics 
The inhabitants of the department are known as Meurthe-et-Mosellans. The area around Nancy has become highly urbanized, whereas the Saintois in the south is quite rural.

Population development since 1801:

Principal towns

The most populous commune is Nancy, the prefecture. As of 2019, there are 10 communes with more than 10,000 inhabitants:

Politics

The president of the Departmental Council is Chaynesse Khirouni, elected in July 2021.

Presidential elections 2nd round

Current National Assembly Representatives

Tourism

See also 
 Arrondissements of the Meurthe-et-Moselle department
 Cantons of the Meurthe-et-Moselle department
 Communes of the Meurthe-et-Moselle department

References

External links 

 Prefecture website 
 Departmental council website 
 Tourism website 

 
1871 establishments in France
Departments of Grand Est
States and territories established in 1871